Lauris Dorothy Edmond  (née Scott, 2 April 1924 – 28 January 2000) was a New Zealand poet and writer.

Biography
Born in Dannevirke, Hawke's Bay, Edmond survived the 1931 Napier earthquake as a child. Trained as a teacher, she raised a family before publishing the poetry she had privately written throughout her life. Following her first book, In Middle Air, written in 1975, she published many volumes of poetry, a novel, an autobiography (Hot October, 1989) and several plays. Her Selected Poems (1984) won the Commonwealth Poetry Prize.

Edmond wrote poetry throughout her life but decided to publish her first collection of verse, In Middle Air, only in 1975, at the age of 51. The work was awarded the PEN Best First Book Award for 1975.  She began her editorial activities in 1979, and in 1980 published a selection of poems by Chris Ward. In 1981 she edited the letters of A.R.D. Fairburn (1904–1957), a noted New Zealand poet of an earlier generation. It was a bold move on her part as the writer in question was not known for his progressive views, but the publication established her as an all‑round woman of letters.  At the same time she received the Katherine Mansfield Memorial Fellowship, which enabled her to stay in the south of France for several months. Edmond's first work of prose was High Country Weather, a book billed as a novel though in fact an extended short‑story of a deeply biographical character, telling – however veiledly – the story of her own incompatible marriage to Trevor Edmond (1920–1990); it was published in 1984, at about the time of her real‑life marriage's dissolution. The feminist awakening marked by that book was sustained in a collection of other women's 'stories' published under her co‑editorship two years later. As Janet Wilson wrote in The Guardian, "She was friend to several generations of women, especially writers, who admired her as a pioneer for breaking with social convention and carving out a successful literary life at a time when this seemed risky".

In 1985 Edmond won the Commonwealth Poetry Prize for her Selected Poems. The following year, she was appointed an Officer of the Order of the British Empire, for services to poetry, in the 1986 Queen's Birthday Honours. Additionally, in 1987 she received the Lilian Ida Smith Award from PEN New Zealand; in 1988 New Zealand's Massey University awarded her an honorary DLitt degree; and in 1999 she received the A.W. Reed Award for Contribution to New Zealand Literature from Booksellers New Zealand, an industry association in Wellington, New Zealand.  After her death a biennial poetry prize was established in her name at the initiative of the Canterbury Poets Collective and the New Zealand Poetry Society, the Lauris Edmond Memorial Award for Poetry, the first prize having been awarded (posthumously) at the Christchurch Arts Festival to the late poet Bill Sewell in 2003.

Her poetry, which continues to influence New Zealand writers, was not all about daffodils; she could speak with a committed voice, as is evidenced in the poem "Nuclear Bomb Test, Mururoa Atoll," which begins:

I am water I am sand
I am a cell in the trembling earth
I am a shaken pebble on the hurt sea floor
a young fish made ill by the predator poison
coursing towards me across the ocean
that was my friend...

Although in life she stayed as far away as was possible from all forms of organised religion, in death her quotations do apparently find their way into various church settings in New Zealand, a proof – if one be needed – of their deep innate spirituality.

Edmond died unexpectedly at her home in Wellington's Oriental Bay on the morning of 28 January 2000. A friend arriving for dinner that evening discovered her body.  She was 75, the mother of six children, five of them daughters, one of whom (Rachel, the fourth child) committed suicide in 1975 (the event is dealt with, poetically, in Edmond's poem-sequence Wellington Letter). Her only son, Martin Edmond (b. 1952), is also a writer.  The Times of London wrote in her obituary (9 February 2000; p. 23) that she acquired 'a sharp new consciousness of her nationality' through her absence from New Zealand after a year as the Katherine Mansfield Memorial Fellow in Menton in the South of France, ending in 1982.

Works

In Middle Air (1975)
Waterfall
The Pear Tree: Poems (1977)
Wellington Letter: A Sequence of Poems (1980)
Seven: Poems (1980)
Salt from the North (1980)
Catching It: Poems (1983)
Selected Poems (1984)
High Country Weather (1984)
Seasons and Creatures (1986)
Summer near the Arctic Circle (1988)
Hot October (1989)
Bonfires in the Rain (1991)

Further reading 
 Buck, Claire (ed.): Bloomsbury Guide to Women's Literature (1992).
 Ken Arvidson, 'Lauris Edmond (1924–2000)', New Zealand Books [a periodical Lauris Edmond co‑founded in 1990], vol. 10, No. 1 (March 2000), p. 23.
 James Brown, ed., The Nature of Things: Poems from the New Zealand Landscape... photographs by Craig Potton (Nelson, New Zealand, Craig Potton Pub., 2005) [includes contributions by Lauris Edmond].
 Kate Camp, ed., Wellington: The City in Literature (Auckland, New Zealand, Exisle Pub., 2003) [includes a contribution by Lauris Edmond].
 Jill Ker Conway, ed. & intro., In her own Words: Women's Memoirs from Australia, New Zealand, Canada, and the United States (New York, Vintage Books, 1999) [includes a contribution by Lauris Edmond].
 Louise Lawrence, ed. & intro., The Penguin Book of New Zealand Letters (Auckland, New Zealand, Penguin Books, 2003) [includes a contribution by Lauris Edmond].
 Michael O'Leary and Mark Pirie, eds., Greatest Hits (Wellington, New Zealand, JAAM Publishing Collective, in association with HeadworX/ESAW, 2004) [includes contributions by Lauris Edmond].
 Nelson Wattie, 'New Literatures', Year's Work in English Studies (Oxford, England), vol. 83, No. 1 (2004), pp. 922–1025 [suggests that the nearness of Lauris Edmond's poetry to solipsism defeats its own claim to generosity of spirit].
Edmond, Lauris, Where Poetry Begins. In Clark, Margaret (ed), Beyond Expectations: fourteen New Zealand women write about their lives. (Allen & Unwin, 1986). p. 37–50.

References

External links
Dictionary of New Zealand Biography, Te Ara - the Encyclopedia of New Zealand
Listing of materials by and about Lauris Edmond from the University of Auckland Library

1924 births
2000 deaths
20th-century New Zealand poets
New Zealand women poets
New Zealand women novelists
New Zealand Officers of the Order of the British Empire
People from Dannevirke
20th-century New Zealand novelists
20th-century New Zealand women writers